The JR East Akita Peckers are a Japanese semi-professional basketball team based in Akita, Akita that competes in the Japan Industrial and Commercial Basketball Federation .

Honors and titles
Japan Industrial and Commercial Basketball Federation Championships
Champions (2): 2004, 2005
Runners-up (1): 2003
Japan Industrial and Commercial Basketball Federation Competitions
Champions (3): 2003, 2004, 2017
Runners-up (5): 2002, 2005, 2006, 2008, 2009
National Sports Festival of Japan
Champions (3):  2017, 2018, 2019

Notable players

Kotaro Oya
Toru Wakatsuki

COVID-19 
17 Peckers players, trainer and their family members have tested positive for Coronavirus in August 2020.

Gallery

References

External links 

 
Basketball teams in Japan
East Japan Railway Company
Sport in Akita (city)
Sports teams in Akita Prefecture
Basketball teams established in 1947
1947 establishments in Japan